A number of steamships have carried the name Ballyholme Bay.

 , built by Sunderland Shipbuilding Co Ltd as Odland, served as Ballyholme Bay 1947–52
 , a Type N3-S ship built as Anthony Enright, served as Ballyholme Bay 1952–53

Ship names